Irene Iddesleigh is a romantic drama novel written by Amanda McKittrick Ros. Its publication in 1897 was financed by Ros's husband as a gift on their tenth wedding anniversary. The plot centers around the complicated love life of a Canterbury lady named Irene. It is widely considered one of the worst books of all time, and has been panned by critics for its use of purple prose and poorly-constructed plot.

Plot 
A noble by the name of Sir John Dunfern makes a sudden decision to marry Irene Iddesleigh, an orphan adopted by a nobleman. Despite her being in love with her tutor, Oscar, she marries Dunfern and has a child, Hugh. However, Dunfern finds love letters Irene received from Oscar dated after the marriage. He flies into a frightful rage and imprisons Irene, intending for her to be in captivity the rest of her life. She is only there for a little more than a year, before Oscar and one of her maids helps her to escape. Oscar can not go back to the job he previously had, since his boss is acquainted with Dunfern. Oscar and Irene quietly sell the house they had previously on loan and move to America. Soon after, they get married.

Dunfern is devastated, but finds solace in Hugh, and sends him to the same school Oscar worked at. At that time, he learns from his friend, Oscar's former boss, that Irene and Oscar were married. While Dunfern felt remorse for Irene's imprisonment and intended to include her in his will, when he learns of their marriage, he cuts Irene out entirely.

Meanwhile, Irene and Oscar are facing difficulties. Convinced they could live entirely off the money he got for selling their Canterbury house for the rest of their lives, Oscar did not see fit to get a job until he and Irene are on the brink of total ruin. When he is fired, he comes home and beats Irene, who leaves and gets a position as a duenna. Later, Oscar feels regretful about hitting Irene, but he can't find her to tell her. He drowns himself, leaving a note for Irene with his apology and begging her to return to Dunfern and apologize. When Irene finds the note, she decides to do so.

However, as Irene decides to return, Dunfern lies dying. He sends for Hugh so that he can tell him about Irene's wrongdoings against him. However, when Hugh arrives, Dunfern has lost his speech capabilities. Mysteriously, he regains them, where he goes into a long monologue about the numerous sins of Irene and reveals for the first time that he originally planned to release Irene on the day she escaped.

Irene arrives in time to see Dunfern's grave, kneels down, and grieves deeply, entirely remorseful for her actions. Hugh, also visiting the grave and not recognizing her, asks what she's doing. She replies, saying she's grieving her husband's death. Affected deeply by his father's deathbed speech earlier, Hugh shouts at Irene, ranting about her wickedness and depravity, and tells her to leave forever.

Having no money and no place to live, Irene commits suicide.

Critical reception 
Irene Iddesleigh received extremely poor reviews from critics. Mark Twain called it "one of the greatest unintentionally humorous novels of all time"; whereas the well-known literary group Inklings turned the novel into a game to see who could read one of Ros's works, namely this one, for the longest without breaking out in laughter. In Epic Fail, Mark O'Connell wrote "Ros’ prose amounts to a sort of accidental surrealism. There is an intention toward metaphor—a lunge in the general direction of the literary—but an obvious misunderstanding of how such things work (and often, for that matter, how syntax works)." O'Connell emphasized that "Ros’ writing is not just bad, in other words; its badness is so potent that it seems to undermine the very idea of literature, to expose the whole endeavor of making art out of language as essentially and irredeemably fraudulent—and, even worse, silly." Robert H. Taylor stated that the novel "is so bad that it is very endearing. [Ros] didn't know anything about grammar or syntax, and she didn't care a rap about the meaning of words, but she loved jeweled prose."

"The book", wrote Barry Pain, in 1898, "has not amused. It began by doing that. Then, as its enormities went on getting more and more enormous in every line, the book seemed something titanic, gigantic, awe-inspiring. The world was full of Irene Iddesleigh, by Mrs. Amanda McKittrick Ros, and I shrank before it in tears and in terror." Ros responded to this remark with a foreword titled "Criticism of Barry Pain on Irene Iddesleigh". In this foreword, she attacks "this so-called Barry Pain" for "criticis[ing] a work the depth of which fails to reach the solving power of his borrowed, and, he'd have you believe, varied talent." Going, on, she says she cares nothing "for the opinion of half-starved upstarts, who don the garb of a shabby-genteel, and fain would feed the mind of the people with the worthless scraps of stolen fancies."

Don Howard of the Salt Lake Telegram said of the book in 1927, "Just to say what the story is all about is, to say the least, extremely vague, as far as any excuse for its telling can be ascertained." He describes the writing style as "hav[ing] the merit of concealing thought and plot, and the mind rocks along through its pages in delirium", and closes the article with "The book, from the pen of an English workman's wife, is rather a unique literary curiosity, which is its only value to the reader."

Notes 
1. The pronunciation   is most likely intended; "eye-ree-nee" was the common Victorian English pronunciation and would fit the pattern of rhyming names used by Ros: Delina Delaney, Helen Huddleson; while "idzly" is the pronunciation used by the Earls of Iddesleigh.

References

External links
Full text of Irene Iddesleigh at Project Gutenberg

 Don Howard reviews 1897 book "Irene Iddesleigh"

1897 novels
19th-century Irish novels
Irish romance novels
Fiction about suicide
Novels set in Kent